Porion is a French surname. Notable people with the surname include:

Charles Porion (1814–1868), French painter
Louis Porion (1805–1858), French politician

French-language surnames
Surnames of French origin